An optical fiber connector joins optical fibers, and enables quicker connection and disconnection than splicing. The connectors mechanically couple and align the cores of fibers so light can pass. Better connectors lose very little light due to reflection or misalignment of the fibers. In all, about 100 different types of fiber optic connectors have been introduced to the market.

Application
Optical fiber connectors are used to join optical fibers where a connect/disconnect capability is required. Due to the polishing and tuning procedures that may be incorporated into optical connector manufacturing, connectors are often assembled onto optical fiber in a supplier's manufacturing facility. However, the assembly and polishing operations involved can be performed in the field, for example, to terminate long runs at a patch panel.

Optical fiber connectors are used in telephone exchanges, for customer premises wiring, and in outside plant applications to connect equipment and fiber-optic cables, or to cross-connect cables.

Most optical fiber connectors are spring-loaded, so the fiber faces are pressed together when the connectors are mated. The resulting glass-to-glass or plastic-to-plastic contact eliminates signal losses that would be caused by an air gap between the joined fibers.

Performance of optical fiber connectors can be quantified by insertion loss and return loss. Measurements of these parameters are now defined in IEC standard 61753-1. The standard gives five grades for insertion loss from A (best) to D (worst), and M for multimode. The other parameter is return loss,  with grades from 1 (best) to 5 (worst).

A variety of optical fiber connectors are available, but SC and LC connectors are the most common types of connectors on the market. Typical connectors are rated for 500–1,000 mating cycles.  The main differences among types of connectors are dimensions and methods of mechanical coupling.  Generally, organizations will standardize on one kind of connector, depending on what equipment they commonly use.

In many data center applications, small (e.g., LC) and multi-fiber (e.g., MTP/MPO) connectors have replaced larger, older styles (e.g., SC), allowing more fiber ports per unit of rack space.

Outside plant applications may require connectors be located underground, or on outdoor walls or utility poles. In such settings, protective enclosures are often used, and fall into two broad categories: hermetic (sealed) and free-breathing. Hermetic cases prevent entry of moisture and air but, lacking ventilation, can become hot if exposed to sunlight or other sources of heat. Free-breathing enclosures, on the other hand, allow ventilation, but can also admit moisture, insects and airborne contaminants. Selection of the correct housing depends on the cable and connector type, the location, and environmental factors.

Types
Many types of optical connector have been developed at different times, and for different purposes. Many of them are summarized in the tables below.

Notes

Obsolete connectors

Contact
Modern connectors typically use a physical contact polish on the fiber and ferrule end. This is a slightly convex surface with the apex of the curve accurately centered on the fiber, so that when the connectors are mated the fiber cores come into direct contact with one another. Some manufacturers have several grades of polish quality, for example a regular FC connector may be designated FC/PC (for physical contact), while FC/SPC and FC/UPC may denote super and ultra polish qualities, respectively. Higher grades of polish give less insertion loss and lower back reflection.

Many connectors are available with the fiber end face polished at an angle to prevent light that reflects from the interface from traveling back up the fiber. Because of the angle, the reflected light does not stay in the fiber core but instead leaks out into the cladding. Angle-polished connectors should only be mated to other angle-polished connectors. The APC angle is normally 8 degrees, however, SC/APC also exists as 9 degrees in some countries. Mating to a non-angle polished connector causes very high insertion loss. Generally angle-polished connectors have higher insertion loss than good quality straight physical contact ones. "Ultra" quality connectors may achieve comparable back reflection to an angled connector when connected, but an angled connection maintains low back reflection even when the output end of the fiber is disconnected.

Angle-polished connections are distinguished visibly by the use of a green strain relief boot, or a green connector body. The parts are typically identified by adding "/APC" (angled physical contact) to the name. For example, an angled FC connector may be designated FC/APC, or merely FCA. Non-angled versions may be denoted FC/PC or with specialized designations such as FC/UPC or FCU to denote an "ultra" quality polish on the fiber end face. Two different versions of FC/APC exist: FC/APC-N (NTT) and FC/APC-R (Reduced). An FC/APC-N connector key will not fit into a FC/APC-R adapter key slot.

Field-mountable connectors
Field-mountable optical fiber connectors are used to join optical fiber jumper cables that contain one single-mode fiber. Field-mountable optical fiber connectors are used for field restoration work and to eliminate the need to stock jumper cords of various sizes.

These assemblies can be separated into two major categories: single-jointed connector assemblies and multiple-jointed connector assemblies. According to Telcordia GR-1081, a single-jointed connector assembly is a connector assembly where there is only one spot where two different fibers are joined together. This is the situation generally found when connector assemblies are made from factory-assembled optical fiber connector plugs. A multiple-jointed connector assembly is a connector assembly where there is more than one closely spaced connection joining different fibers together. An example of a multiple-jointed connector assembly is a connector assembly that uses the stub-fiber type of connector plug.

Attributes
Features of good connector design:
Low insertion loss - should not exceed 0.75 dB
Typical insertion repeatability, the difference in insertion loss between one plugging and another, is 0.2 dB.
High return loss (low amounts of reflection at the interface) - should be higher than 20 dB
Ease of installation
Low cost
Reliability
Low environmental sensitivity
Ease of use

Analysis
 On all connectors, cleaning the ceramic ferrule before each connection helps prevent scratches and extends the connector life substantially.
 Connectors on polarization-maintaining fiber are sometimes marked with a blue strain relief boot or connector body. Sometimes a blue buffer tube is used on the fiber instead.
 Hardened Fiber Optic Connectors (HFOCs) and Hardened Fiber Optic Adapters (HFOAs) are passive telecommunications components used in an outside plant environment. They provide drop connections to customers from fiber distribution networks. These components may be provided in pedestal closures, aerial and buried closures and terminals, or equipment located at customer premises such as a Fiber Distribution Hub (FDH) or an optical network terminal unit.
 These connectors, which are field-mateable and hardened for use in the OSP, are needed to support Fiber to the Premises (FTTP) deployment and service offerings. HFOCs are designed to withstand climatic conditions existing throughout the U.S., including rain, flooding, snow, sleet, high winds, and ice and sand storms.
 Telcordia GR-3120 contains the industry’s most recent generic requirements for  HFOCs and HFOAs.

Testing
Glass fiber optic connector performance is affected both by the connector and by the glass fiber. Concentricity tolerances affect the fiber, fiber core, and connector body.  The core optical index of refraction is also subject to variations. Stress in the polished fiber can cause excess return loss. The fiber can slide along its length in the connector. The shape of the connector tip may be incorrectly profiled during polishing. The connector manufacturer has little control over these factors, so in-service performance may well be below the manufacturer's specification.

Testing fiber optic connector assemblies falls into two general categories: factory testing and field testing.

Factory testing is sometimes statistical, for example, a process check. A profiling system may be used to ensure the overall polished shape is correct, and a good quality optical microscope to check for blemishes. Insertion loss and return loss performance is checked using specific reference conditions, against a reference-standard single-mode test lead, or using an encircled flux compliant source for multi-mode testing. Testing and rejection (yield) may represent a significant part of the overall manufacturing cost.

Field testing is usually simpler. A special hand-held optical microscope is used to check for dirt or blemishes. A power meter and light source or an optical loss test set (OLTS) is used to test end-to-end loss, and an optical time-domain reflectometer may be used to identify significant point losses or return losses.

See also
 Gap loss – attenuation sources and causes
 Index-matching material – a liquid/gel to reduce Fresnel reflection
 Mechanical splice – a more permanent, but still mechanical connection
 Optical attenuator – fiber optic attenuator

Notes

References

External links

Fiber Optic Connector Reference
How To Terminate Fiber Optic Connectors
Fiber optic connector termination processes

 

es:Fibra óptica#Tipos de conectores